Abarsas was an ancient district in present-day southern  Iran. It is first mentioned in the early 3rd-century as part of the fief of the Parthian dynast Mihrak. In 222, his fief was conquered by the Sasanian king Ardashir I (r. 224–242), who two years later had it incorporated into the administrative division of Ardashir-Khwarrah.

Sources 
 

 

Sasanian cities
History of Fars Province